Pargas is a town and municipality of Finland, in the Archipelago Sea, the biggest archipelago in the world by the number of islands, 50,000. The big limestone mine in Pargas is the base of the main industry and except for the central parts, the municipality is still mostly rural.

Pargas is located in Åboland in the province of Western Finland and is part of the Southwest Finland region. It was created as Väståboland on 1 January 2009 in Southwest Finland, when the municipalities of Pargas, Nagu, Korpo, Houtskär and Iniö were merged into a single municipality.

The town is bilingual with a majority speaking Swedish as their native language.

Economy
Pargas has a large limestone industry, with the industry and Nordkalk as an important local employer, agriculture employs many in the rural regions of the municipality. Furthermore, the shipping industry is a relevant industry in the region. The municipality is suffering from high debt.

History
Archaeological excavations revealed that the vikings used to travel to the archipelago in the 9th century.

Karin Thomasdotter (1610–1697), who served as vogt in Pargas for over forty years, was one of the longest serving vogts, and also one of only two females to have the position in contemporary Finland.

Recent history 
On 1 January 2009, Pargas, Nagu, Korpo, Houtskär and Iniö merged to form the new municipality of Väståboland.

Name dispute
Shortly after the merge, people started debating if the Väståboland name was the right name for the merged municipality; those arguing against the Väståboland name proposed Pargas as a 'new' name. The former municipalities could not agree on a new name, and Pargas insisted on a change, so the state had to step in and decided that the name would be Väståboland. The debates became heated and a referendum was arranged to decide what name the municipality should have in May 2011. The result of the referendum showed that 57,7% of the voters supported Pargas and 40.1% of voters supported Väståboland. Though the overall majority supported changing the name, there was an overwhelming support for the name Väståboland in 4 out of 5 of the former municipalities. In Iniö, only 1 voter out of 173 total voted for Pargas, in all four, 62 out of 2060, while in Pargas proper, 74,5% voted for Pargas.

The municipality council decided on 14 June 2011 in favour of the majority population and decided to rename the municipality Pargas on 1 January 2012. The Council considered taking this issue up again for debate and vote. The council made a re-vote on 6 September 2011 with 25 votes for Pargas, 17 for Väståboland and 1 blank vote.

Merge with Kimitoön
The possibility of merging with Kimitoön to form a single municipality that would include the entire Åboland archipelago has been discussed since 2007, with interest being reignited by the healthcare reforms during the Sipilä Cabinet.

Climate

Pargas has a humid continental climate (Köppen climate classification Dfb) closely bordering on a oceanic climate (Cfb).

International relations

Twin towns — Sister cities
Pargas is twinned with:
  Haninge Municipality, Sweden

See also
 Utö Island

References

External links

 Town of Pargas – Official website

 
Cities and towns in Finland
Populated coastal places in Finland
Populated places established in 2009